The Social Democratic Party of Pridnestrovie (Moldovan Cyrillic: Партидул Сочиал-Демократ дин Нистрения;) was a social-democratic political party in Transnistria.

It was formed on 25 January 2007 by Alexander Radchenko, a former member of the Transnistrian Supreme Council. Unlike other political parties in Transnistria, it supports conditional unification with Moldova with a high amount of autonomy for Transnistria. After 2009, the party lost its influence and faded. As of 2013, it doesn't function, has no offices, staff or membership, although it never officially declared its dissolution.

References 

Political parties established in 2007
Political parties in Transnistria
Social democratic parties